Elizabeth Closs Traugott (born April 9, 1939 in the UK) is an American linguist and Professor Emerita of Linguistics and English, Stanford University. She is best known for her work on grammaticalization, subjectification, and constructionalization.

Education and Career 
Traugott earned her BA in English Language at Oxford University in 1960 and her PhD in English Language at the University of California, Berkeley in 1964.

Elizabeth Traugott's initial appointment was in the English Department at the University of California, Berkeley (1964-1970). After year-long teaching appointments at the University of Dar es Salaam, Tanzania, and University of York, UK, she was appointed Associate Professor of Linguistics and English at Stanford University in 1970, and Professor from 1977 until her retirement in 2003. She served as Chair of the Department of Linguistics at Stanford University from 1980-1985 and as Vice Provost and Dean of Graduate Studies from 1985-1991. Elizabeth Traugott was honored with honorary doctorates from Uppsala University (2006) and The University of Helsinki (2010).

She was a pioneer in generative historical syntax. Dissatisfaction with generative models led her to collaborate with Paul Hopper (Carnegie Mellon University) and develop a functional approach to grammaticalization, understood as the change whereby lexical items and constructions come in certain linguistic contexts to serve grammatical functions (Hopper and Traugott 1993, revised ed. 2003). More recently she has worked with Graeme Trousdale (University of Edinburgh) on constructionalization. Based in Construction Grammar, constructionalization provides a framework that incorporates several aspects of grammaticalization and lexicalization within a unified theory of how new meaning-new form constructions arise. Other interests include the development of pragmatic markers, especially those in utterance-final position.

Awards and distinctions 
Traugott held a Guggenheim fellowship in 1983 and a fellowship at the Center for Advanced Study in the Behavioral Sciences in 1983-84. She was President of the International Society for Historical Linguistics (ISHL) in 1979, of the Linguistic Society of America (LSA) in 1987, and of the International Society for the Linguistics of English (ISLE) in 2007-2008. She is currently a Corresponding Fellow of the British Academy, a Fellow of the Linguistic Society of America and Fellow of the American Association for the Advancement of Science (AAAS). In 2019 she was awarded the John J. Gumperz Lifetime Achievement Award of the International Pragmatics Association (IPrA).

Her papers are archived by the School of Advanced Study, University of London.

Publications 
Selected Books

1972	A History of English Syntax. New York: Holt, Rinehart, and Winston.

1980	(Elizabeth Closs Traugott and Mary L. Pratt) Linguistics for Students of Literature. New York: Harcourt, Brace, Jovanovich, Inc.

1986	(Elizabeth Closs Traugott, Alice ter Meulen, Judith Snitzer Reilly, and Charles A. Ferguson, eds.) On Conditionals, Cambridge: Cambridge University Press.

1991	(Elizabeth Closs Traugott and Bernd Heine, eds.) Approaches to Grammaticalization, 2 Vols., Amsterdam: Benjamins.

1993	(Paul Hopper and Elizabeth Closs Traugott) Grammaticalization. Cambridge: Cambridge University Press.

2002	(Elizabeth Closs Traugott and Richard B. Dasher) Regularity in Semantic Change. Cambridge: Cambridge University Press.

2003	(Paul Hopper and Elizabeth Closs Traugott) Grammaticalization. Cambridge: Cambridge University Press, revised 2nd edition.

2005	(Laurel J. Brinton and Elizabeth Closs Traugott) Lexicalization and Language Change. Cambridge: Cambridge University Press.
 
2010	(Elizabeth Closs Traugott and Graeme Trousdale, eds.) Gradience, Gradualness and Grammaticalization. Amsterdam: Benjamins.

2012	(Terttu Nevalainen and Elizabeth Closs Traugott, eds.) The Oxford Handbook of the History of English. New York: Oxford University Press.

2013	(Elizabeth Closs Traugott and Graeme Trousdale) Constructionalization and Constructional Changes. Oxford: Oxford University Press.

References

External links 
Her university page:  http://www.stanford.edu/~traugott/
 "Pioneering Women Tier II: Women Hired at Stanford in the Late 1960s and Early 1970s," Stanford Historical Society Panel Discussion, 2016.

Linguists from the United States
Women linguists
Historical linguists
Living people
Fellows of the American Association for the Advancement of Science
Linguistic Society of America presidents
Corresponding Fellows of the British Academy
Fellows of the Linguistic Society of America
1939 births